Niagara Fall is a waterfall in the commune of Sainte-Suzanne on the island of Réunion.

It is of easy access by car, and its pool is a popular picnic place on weekends and holidays.

References 

Waterfalls of Réunion
Sainte-Suzanne, Réunion
Plunge waterfalls